Ute de Lange Nilsen Scharf (born August 2, 1931) is a Czech-Norwegian jewelry artist and puppet maker living in Arendal.

Ute de Lange Nilsen was born in Jablonec nad Nisou. She studied in Germany from 1947 to 1950, where she obtained her journeyman certification as a goldsmith, and then at the College of Art and Crafts from 1948 to 1953.

She moved to Norway as a newly graduated goldsmith in 1953/54. There she worked for one year at the Holthe jewelry factory in Arendal, and then moved back to Germany to obtain her master-tradesman's certificate in 1956. Later she returned to Arendal, where she still lives. There she had her own goldsmith workshop and several retail locations in the town. She participated in several exhibits, including the traveling exhibit Norwegian Arts and Crafts from Agder in 1982, at the Lyngdal Art Society in 1982, and at the Hillestad Gallery in Tovdal in 1987. In addition to working with jewelry, she has created artworks in metal, stone, and enamel. People, faces, masks, geology, plants, and animals are among her many interests and inspirations.

She is also known for her puppet theater work, and she was active in Arendal's puppet theater and in the Arendal Drama Society. She has held many courses in puppet making and arranged puppet theater classes for children. The performance Den magiske kosten (The Magic Broom) in February 2013 was her 19th and last performance since the theater was established in the late 1960s.

Ute de Lange Nilsen is a member of the Norwegian Craftsmen's Association of South Norway and the International Puppetry Association.

References

Further reading
 Solberg, Harald. 1996. En presentasjon Norske kunsthandverkere Agder. Skien: Oluf Rasmussen AS, pp. 47, 54.

1931 births
Living people
People from Jablonec nad Nisou
Norwegian women artists
Czechoslovak expatriates in Germany
Czechoslovak emigrants to Norway